Cutten, a census-designated place (CDP) in Humboldt County, California, United States, is an unincorporated community, which is part of Greater Eureka. The city was named for David Page Cutten and his family, who were prominent figures in the history of Humboldt County during the early 1850s. Its population is 3,223 as of the 2020 census, up from 3,108 from the 2010 census.

Geography

History
The first post office at Cutten opened in 1929.  An early name for the area was the Cutten-McDonald Tract. The ZIP Code is 95534. However, the 95534 zip code is specific to the post office only and all physical addresses within the CDP have the Eureka, California 95503 zip code.

Demographics

2010
The 2010 United States Census reported that Cutten had a population of 3,108. The racial makeup of Cutten was 2,628 (84.6%) White, 27 (0.9%) African American, 119 (3.8%) Native American, 80 (2.6%) Asian, 11 (0.4%) Pacific Islander, 78 (2.5%) from other races, and 165 (5.3%) from two or more races. Hispanic or Latino of any race were 254 persons (8.2%).

The Census reported that 3,092 people (99.5% of the population) lived in households, 11 (0.4%) lived in non-institutionalized group quarters, and 5 (0.2%) were institutionalized.

There were 1,304 households, out of which 407 (31.2%) had children under the age of 18 living in them, 574 (44.0%) were opposite-sex married couples living together, 141 (10.8%) had a female householder with no husband present, 80 (6.1%) had a male householder with no wife present.  There were 94 (7.2%) unmarried opposite-sex partnerships, and 14 (1.1%) same-sex married couples or partnerships. 390 households (29.9%) were made up of individuals, and 153 (11.7%) had someone living alone who was 65 years of age or older. The average household size was 2.37.  There were 795 families (61.0% of all households); the average family size was 2.95.

The population was spread out, with 718 people (23.1%) under the age of 18, 287 people (9.2%) aged 18 to 24, 798 people (25.7%) aged 25 to 44, 823 people (26.5%) aged 45 to 64, and 482 people (15.5%) who were 65 years of age or older.  The median age was 37.9 years. For every 100 females, there were 96.2 males.  For every 100 females age 18 and over, there were 92.3 males.

The homeowner vacancy rate was 2.3%; the rental vacancy rate was 3.4%.  1,762 people (56.7% of the population) lived in owner-occupied housing units and 1,330 people (42.8%) lived in rental housing units.

2000
As of the census of 2000, there were 2,933 people, 1,197 households, and 799 families residing in the CDP. The racial makeup of the CDP was 87.93% White, 0.75% Black or African American, 3.07% Native American, 1.50% Asian, 0.38% Pacific Islander, 2.11% from other races, and 4.26% from two or more races.  6.00% of the population were Hispanic or Latino of any race.

There were 1,197 households, out of which 30.6% had children under the age of 18 living with them, 49.0% were married couples living together, 12.4% had a female householder with no husband present, and 33.2% were non-families. 24.5% of all households were made up of individuals, and 8.9% had someone living alone who was 65 years of age or older.  The average household size was 2.40 and the average family size was 2.85.

In the CDP, the population was spread out, with 23.4% under the age of 18, 10.0% from 18 to 24, 25.8% from 25 to 44, 27.4% from 45 to 64, and 13.4% who were 65 years of age or older.  The median age was 39 years. For every 100 females, there were 89.6 males.  For every 100 females age 18 and over, there were 88.4 males.

The median income for a household in the CDP was $35,786, and the median income for a family was $42,283. Males had a median income of $39,545 versus $21,574 for females. The per capita income for the CDP was $19,317.  About 8.3% of families and 13.5% of the population were below the poverty line, including 13.7% of those under age 18 and 10.0% of those age 65 or over.

Politics

See also

References

Eureka, California
Census-designated places in Humboldt County, California
Census-designated places in California